Peter Cornelius (1824–1874) was a German composer.

Peter Cornelius may also refer to:

 Pieter Corneliszoon Plockhoy (c. 1625–c. 1664/70), Dutch Mennonite who founded a settlement in Delaware, USA
 Peter von Cornelius (1784–1867), German painter
 Peter Cornelius (opera singer) (fl. 1892–1922), Danish opera singer
 Peter Cornelius (photographer) (1913–1970), German photographer and photojournalist
 Peter Cornelius (musician) (born 1951), Austrian pop-singer, guitarist and former member of Enigma